La Victoria is a census-designated place (CDP) in Starr County, Texas, United States. La Victoria went through some changes prior to the 2010 census. It gained area, had parts taken to form new CDPs, and lost additional area. Only a small part of 2010 La Victoria CDP was within the 2000 La Victoria CDP. The population was only 171 at the 2010 census down from 
1,683 at the 2000 census.

Geography
La Victoria is located at  (26.347791, -98.629488)

According to the United States Census Bureau, the CDP has a total area of 0.3 square miles (0.8 km2), all land.

Demographics
As of the census of 2000, there were 1,683 people, 423 households, and 401 families residing in the CDP. The population density was 462.2 people per square mile (178.5/km2). There were 548 housing units at an average density of 150.5/sq mi (58.1/km2). The racial makeup of the CDP was 96.20% White, 0.53% African American, 0.06% Native American, 0.06% Asian, 2.85% from other races, and 0.30% from two or more races. Hispanic or Latino of any race were 99.11% of the population.

There were 423 households, out of which 63.4% had children under the age of 18 living with them, 82.3% were married couples living together, 9.5% had a female householder with no husband present, and 5.0% were non-families. 4.3% of all households were made up of individuals, and 1.2% had someone living alone who was 65 years of age or older. The average household size was 3.98 and the average family size was 4.10.

In the CDP, the population was spread out, with 39.2% under the age of 18, 10.8% from 18 to 24, 29.8% from 25 to 44, 15.4% from 45 to 64, and 4.8% who were 65 years of age or older. The median age was 25 years. For every 100 females, there were 98.5 males. For every 100 females age 18 and over, there were 97.9 males.

The median income for a household in the CDP was $21,723, and the median income for a family was $22,708. Males had a median income of $16,667 versus $15,500 for females. The per capita income for the CDP was $5,733. About 39.6% of families and 41.5% of the population were below the poverty line, including 50.1% of those under age 18 and 50.0% of those age 65 or over.

Education
La Victoria is served by the Rio Grande City Grulla Independent School District (formerly Rio Grande City Consolidated Independent School District)

References

Census-designated places in Starr County, Texas
Census-designated places in Texas